The Nervures Alpamayo is a French two-place paraglider that was designed by Xavier Demoury and produced by Nervures of Soulom. It is now out of production.

Design and development
The Alpamayo was designed as a tandem glider for flight training and as such was referred to as the Biplace Alpamayo, indicating that it is a two seater. It was replaced in production by the Nervures Arteson.

Variants
Alpamayo 38
Small-sized model for lighter pilots. The glider model is CEN-1999 Biplace certified.
Alpamayo 43
Large-sized model for heavier pilots. The glider model is AFNOR Biplace and CEN-1999 Biplace certified.

Specifications (Alpamayo 43)

References

External links
Official website

Alpamayo
Paragliders